Frederick Douglass Hobgood (October 1, 1921 – September 23, 1965) was an American Negro league pitcher in the 1940s.

A native of Kinston, North Carolina, Hobgood made his Negro leagues debut in 1941 for the Newark Eagles. He played for Newark through 1944 and again in 1946, and also played briefly for the Philadelphia Stars in 1944. Hobgood died in Kinston in 1965 at age 43.

References

External links
 and Seamheads
 Fred Hobgood biography from Society for American Baseball Research (SABR)

1921 births
1965 deaths
Newark Eagles players
Philadelphia Stars players
20th-century African-American sportspeople
Baseball pitchers